Kim Tyrone Grant (born 25 September 1972) is a former professional footballer who has been involved in top level professional football for over 24 years, playing in Europe and Asia.

Club career
Born in Sekondi-Takoradi, Grant started his career at Charlton Athletic in their youth system and he signed his first professional contract in March 1991. He went on to make 155 appearances spanning over nine years and scoring 25 goals. He later made appearances for Charlton against Manchester United and Liverpool in the FA Cup and scored a 20-yard curler to beat David James in a 2–1 defeat to in 1996.

In March 1996, Luton Town paid £250,000 to bring him to Kenilworth Road. He spent one and a half years at Luton, making 43 appearances and scoring eight goals. Following a loan spell in which he scored four goals in five appearances, Grant moved to Millwall for £185,000 in September 1997 and went on to make 57 appearances, scoring nine goals. He was on loan at Notts County from December 1998 to February 1999, where he made six appearances and scored one goal.

Grant left Millwall in 1999 to play in the Belgium Premier League with KFC Lommel, commanding a transfer fee of £65,000. After one season with Lommel, during which he scored three goals in 19 league appearances, he left and played in the Portuguese second division for F.C. Marco in the 2000–01 season, making two league appearances.

Grant returned to England in August 2001 after signing for Scunthorpe United, making five appearances and scoring one goal, before signing with Yeovil Town in October. In his first year, Yeovil won the FA Trophy cup and finished second in the Football Conference. In his second year, Yeovil has crowned champions of the Football Conference, winning promotion to the Football League.

Having made 39 appearances and scored eight goals for Yeovil Grant returned to Portugal in 2003 to sign for Imortal Albufeira where he played for the 2003–04 season, making 12 league appearances and scoring six goals. Grant later played in the Malaysian Superleague for Sarawak FA, scoring three goals in eight league appearances in 2004. A spell with Japanese 2nd division side Shonan Bellmare followed, failing to make any appearances in 2005.

He returned to England with Gravesend & Northfleet in August 2005. After making seven appearances and scoring one goal for Gravesend Grant had a four-game spell with AFC Wimbledon after signing in February 2006. He signed for Sengkang Punggol FC of the S.League in 2006, where he scored 10 goals in 19 league appearances. He signed for Geylang United FC in 2007, making seven league appearances and scoring three goals. He was released for a serious disciplinary breach after swearing.

International career
From 1996 to 1997, Grant was capped seven times and scored once for his country of birth Ghana.

Coaching and managerial career
Grant was appointed as manager of Conference National side Woking in May 2008. However, after seven games, from which Woking picked up two points, he was sacked on 3 September. He returned to Ghana in the summer of 2009 to become the owner and head coach of the newly founded club F.C. Takoradi. In January 2014, Grant established and founded Kim Grant International Football Academy KG-IFA. In May 2014, Kim Grant was appointed the technical director of Cape-Coast Ebusua Dwarfs FC. Having arrived at the club languishing in the last position in the Ghana premier league, Grant was able to turn the fortunes of the club to finish 9th in the league saving them from relegation. In April 2017, he was appointed head coach of Saif Sporting Club Limited. The newly formed professional club based in Dhaka, Bangladesh, is looking to be a force in the Bangladesh football with hopes of winning the Bangladesh premier league title with a view to qualifying for the AFC Cup Saif Sporting Club.

In December 2017, Kim Grant was appointed the technical director of Elmina Sharks Football Club, Sea Lions F.C. (ladies), Elmina Football Academy (youth). After leaving his position as Head Coach of Saif Sporting Club at the end of the first round of the Bangladesh premier league, Grant was approached and appointed Technical Director by Ghana premier league side Elmina Sharks Football Club to help aid the club's development and with its ambitions of finishing in the top four for the upcoming 2018 Ghana Premier league season. After resigning from his position as Technical director of Elmina Sharks Football Club in October 2018, Kim Grant was appointed Director of Football and Head Coach of Ghana premier league giants Accra Hearts of Oak. Grant penned a three-year contract.

Kim Grant was appointed Director of Football and Head Coach of Ghana premier league giants Accra Hearts of Oak S.C. Hearts has penned Kim Grant on a three-year contract with hopes of winning the Ghana premier league title and to qualify for the CAF Champions League. Kim Grant was unveiled at the press conference on 8 November and will officially begin his contract on 1 December 2018. Accra Hearts of Oak S.C. Kim Grant's contract with Accra Hearts of Oak SC was terminated on 31 December 2019, reasons for which the Board of the team did not give details.

See also 
 Paa Grant Soccer Academy

References

External links

1972 births
Living people
Ghanaian footballers
Ghanaian expatriate footballers
Ghana international footballers
Association football forwards
Charlton Athletic F.C. players
Luton Town F.C. players
Millwall F.C. players
Notts County F.C. players
K.F.C. Lommel S.K. players
Scunthorpe United F.C. players
Yeovil Town F.C. players
Shonan Bellmare players
Ebbsfleet United F.C. players
AFC Wimbledon players
Hougang United FC players
Geylang International FC players
Woking F.C. players
International Allies F.C. players
English Football League players
National League (English football) players
J2 League players
Expatriate footballers in Japan
Expatriate footballers in Malaysia
Ghanaian football managers
Woking F.C. managers
Ghanaian expatriate sportspeople in Japan
Ghanaian expatriate sportspeople in Malaysia
Ghanaian expatriate sportspeople in Singapore
Expatriate footballers in Singapore
Singapore Premier League players
Ghanaian expatriate football managers
Saif SC managers
Accra Hearts of Oak S.C. managers